Core is an unincorporated community in Monongalia County, West Virginia, United States.

The community was named after the local Core family.

References

Unincorporated communities in Monongalia County, West Virginia
Unincorporated communities in West Virginia